The 2020–21 Segunda División season, also known as LaLiga SmartBank for sponsorship reasons, was the 90th since its establishment. The season began on 12 September 2020 and concluded on 31 May 2021.

Teams

Promotion and relegation (pre-season)
A total of 22 teams contested the league, including 15 sides from the 2019–20 season, three relegated from the 2019–20 La Liga, and four promoted from the 2019–20 Segunda División B. This included the winners of the play-offs.

Teams promoted to La Liga

On 12 July 2020, Cádiz were the first team to be promoted to La Liga, ending a 14-year run in the lower divisions, seven of which were spent in Segunda División B, following Oviedo's 1−0 win against Zaragoza. The second team to earn promotion was Huesca after their 3−0 win against Numancia on 17 July 2020. This marks an immediate return to the first division. The final team to achieve promotion were play-off winners Elche after defeating Girona 1−0 on aggregate, they return to La Liga after a five-year absence, with one of those seasons spent in Segunda División B.

Teams relegated from La Liga
 
The first team to be relegated from La Liga were Espanyol. They were relegated on 8 July 2020, after a 1−0 loss against Barcelona in the Derbi Barceloní, after a 26-year stay in the top tier. The second team to be relegated were Mallorca, who were relegated on 16 July 2020 after a 1−2 home defeat against Granada, suffering an immediate return to the second division. The third and final relegated club were Leganés, after a 2−2 draw against Real Madrid on 19 July 2020, ending their four-year stay in La Liga.

Teams relegated to Segunda División B

The first team to be relegated from Segunda División were Racing Santander, after a 1−2 home loss against Elche on 4 July 2020, suffering an immediate return to the Segunda División B. The second team to be relegated were Extremadura, who were relegated on 4 July 2020 after trailing to Numancia 1−0 at home, ending a two-year stay in the second division. On 20 July 2020, the final round of the 2019–20 season, Numancia and Deportivo La Coruña were relegated after Albacete won 1–0 away to Cádiz. This ended Deportivo's 39-year streak in professional football, spending 25 of those years in La Liga, and also ended Numancia's 23-year stay in professional football, spending 4 of those years in La Liga.

Teams promoted from Segunda División B

Following the play-offs, the first team to achieve promotion were UD Logroñés after defeating Castellón on penalties on 18 July 2020. They were set to play in the Segunda División for the first time in their history, and to bring back professional football to La Rioja 20 years after the relegation of former CD Logroñés. The second team to earn promotion were Cartagena on 19 July 2020 after beating Atlético Baleares on penalties as well, they return to Segunda after eight years. Sabadell and Castellón were the last teams to get promoted on 26 July 2020 after defeating Barcelona B and Cornellà in their respective playoff matches. Sabadell return to the division after a five-year absence whereas Castellón return after ten years.

Stadiums and locations
Mallorca signed a sponsorship contract with Consell de Mallorca and other public entities for renaming their stadium as the Visit Mallorca Stadium.

Personnel and sponsorship

Managerial changes

League table

Standings

Results

Positions by round

The table lists the positions of teams after each week of matches. In order to preserve chronological evolvements, any postponed matches are not included to the round at which they were originally scheduled, but added to the full round they were played immediately afterwards.

Promotion play-offs

Season statistics

Top goalscorers

Top assists

Zamora Trophy

The Zamora Trophy is awarded by newspaper MARCA to the goalkeeper with the lowest goals-to-games ratio. A goalkeeper has to have played at least 28 games of 60 or more minutes to be eligible for the trophy.

Hat-tricks

Note
(H) – Home ; (A) – Away

Discipline

Player
 Most yellow cards: 17
  Edgar González (Oviedo)
 Most red cards: 4
  Pathé Ciss (Fuenlabrada)

Team
 Most yellow cards: 117
 Almería
 Most red cards: 12
 Girona
 Fewest yellow cards: 70
 Alcorcón
 Fewest red cards: 1
 Mirandés

Awards

Monthly

Number of teams by region

References

 
2020-21
Spain
2